is a Japanese band that formed in 2012 by indigo la End front-man Enon Kawatani. Describing themselves as "hip-hop/progressive", the band debuted in 2013 with independent label Space Shower Records, later signed by Warner sub-label Unborde. In 2018, the band left label Unborde and joined TACO RECORDS, founded by Enon Kawatani.

Biography 

The band was formed in May 2012 by Enon Kawatani, out of members of other musical units. Kawatani formed the band out of people he respected, and had enjoyed performing with. Kawatani concurrently worked as the vocalist and songwriter for indigo la End, a band he had been a member of since 2009. Of the members, he chose Kyūjitsu Kachō, who was a former member of indigo la End, as well as Chan Mari and Hona Ikoka, from the bands Crimson and Microcosm respectively. The members had known each other since early 2010, from performing together at different events at the Shimokitazawa Era live house in Tokyo. They saw the project as more for fun, aside from their usual musical endeavours. The band name came from a custom tote bag that Chan Mari had brought with her to the recording studio, which had been created by a friend of her who attended art school.

indigo la End released their debut album Yoru ni Mahō o Kakerarete in February 2013. Two months later saw Gesu no Kiwami Otome's first release, the extended play Dress no Nugikata, which was recorded in only two days. The band played numerous live concerts around Japan in 2013, and in September became the regular DJs for the J-Wave radio show The Kings Place.

In December, Gesu no Kiwami Otome released their second extended play Odorenai nara, Gesu ni Natte Shimae yo, which was nominated at the 6th CD Shop Awards. In December, the band was also signed to Warner sub-label Unborde simultaneously with indigo la End. Both musical units released their major label debut released on April 2, 2014: Minna Normal for Gesu no Kiwami Otome and Ano Machi Record for Indigo la End.

In August 2014, the band released a double A-side Ryōkiteki na Kiss o Watashi ni Shite / Asobi, with the former song serving as the drama Around 30-chan: Mushūsei'''s opening theme song and the latter in a commercial campaign for au. The band also performed at Music Station for the first time on August 29. This was followed by the band's debut album Miryoku ga Sugoi yo in October 2014.

The following year, the band released three singles, Watashi Igai Watashi ja Nai no, Romance ga Ariamaru, including their second double-A side Otonatic / Muku na Kisetsu, with the latter song having had a prior release as a digital single. The song Romance ga Ariamaru was used in the 2015 science-fiction film Strayer's Chronicle. In January 2016, their second studio album Ryōseibai was released, reaching the top spot on the Oricon sales ranking website and selling over 100,000 copies.

In October 2016, the band entered into hiatus due to the personal affairs of vocalist and songwriter Kawatani Enon, but has since resumed to normal activities, with the band releasing their third studio album, Daruma Ringo, in May 2017. Later that year the band released the digital single Anata ni wa Makenai in October.

In January 2018, the band released their 5th single, Tatakatte Shimau yo, with the title track featuring in Japanese commercials for the mobile game Clash Royale. In May 2018, they released another digital single, Mou Setsunai to wa Iwasenai, in celebration of their six year anniversary, and announced their 4th studio album, Suki nara Towanai. Releasing August 2018, it was the first release under the group's new label TACO RECORDS, founded by band leader Kawatani, having left previous label unBorde. The album includes the song Sasso to Hashiru Tonegawa-kun, which served as the opening theme song for the Japanese animated series Mr. Tonegawa: Middle Management Blues.

 Members 
, real name , also known as MC.K, is the band's vocalist, guitarist and main songwriter, who also serves as the frontman for indigo la End.
, real name , is the band's bassist. He was member of indigo la End under the name , before leaving the band in July 2011. From 2007 to 2009, Wada was a member of the band Aomune, performing under the name . During the group's hiatus in 2016, he joined the band DADARAY, produced by Kawatani, as bassist, along with vocalist REIS and Gesu no Kiwami Otome & indigo la End support member Etsuko. In 2018, Wada was a cast member on the reality television show Terrace House: Opening New Doors.
, real name , is the keyboardist for the band. She is also the keyboardist for the band Crimson, which formed in Kagoshima in 2005.
, real name , is the band's drummer. She has been a member of the duo Microcosm since 2009, performing drums and chorus.

 Artistry 

Vocalist Enon Kawatani is the sole songwriter for the band. This is despite other members having some experience with song writing, such as Chan Mari who composed the song  on Crimson's EP World Scape (2012). The band has been praised for their performance skills, their strong personalities and Kawatani's songwriting. The band's dynamic mixed genre sound has drawn the praise of many critics, including What's In? critic Nobuaki Onuki.

In March 2015, Gesu no Kiwami Otome was awarded the best artist award at the 7th CD Shop Awards, due to their extended play Minna Normal and their debut album Miryoku ga Sugoi yo''.

Discography

Studio albums

Extended plays

Singles

As lead artists

As featured artists

Promotional singles

Awards and nominations

Notes

References

External links 

 
 Official Warner Label Site

2012 establishments in Japan
Japanese rock music groups
Japanese alternative rock groups
Japanese indie rock groups
Musical groups established in 2012
Musical groups from Tokyo
Musical quartets
Warner Music Japan artists
Supergroups (music)